Lauren Beth Gash (born June 11, 1960) is an American lawyer and Democratic Party politician who served in the Illinois House of Representatives from 1993 to 2001. She was the Democratic nominee for Congress in the 10th District of Illinois, but was narrowly defeated by Republican Mark Kirk.

Born in Summit, New Jersey, and raised in Berkeley Heights, New Jersey Gash received her bachelor's degree in psychology from Clark University and her J.D. degree from Georgetown University Law Center. Gash was admitted to the Illinois bar and lives in Highland Park, Illinois. Gash is involved with the Democratic Party. Gash served in the Illinois House of Representatives from 1993 to 2001. Gash has a general practice, with a focus on not-for-profit organizations, civil rights, election law and public policy.

Hon. Gash has served as a Commissioner with the Illinois Human Rights Commission. Prior to that, she served four terms in the Illinois House of Representatives, where she chaired the Judiciary Committee. She was also vice-chair of the Elections and Campaign Reform Committee.  Gash previously worked in Washington, D.C., and has served on the staffs of U.S. Senators Alan Dixon and Paul Simon.

Gash is a vice-chair of the Democratic Party of Illinois, as well as the founding chair of the Tenth Congressional District Democrats (Tenth Dems), a grassroots organization dedicated to building a strong infrastructure in Chicago's northern and northwestern suburbs.  She was a member of the Electoral College in 2008, 2012 and 2016. She was an elected delegate to the Democratic National Convention several times.

Gash, a frequently-requested speaker and panelist, is a life-long community organizer who has served on numerous not-for-profit boards, including the League of Women Voters, PTA and the Anti-Defamation League. She is a former volunteer attorney at Prairie State Legal Services.

Gash regularly organizes Election Protection teams, CLE (continuing legal education) seminars, job interview workshops, expungement and sealing events with volunteer attorneys, and an annual student Poetry and Prose contest. The Election Protection team puts 125 lawyers at polling places, working to make sure that everyone who is entitled to vote is actually allowed to vote. Gash believes that politics should be about more than elections; it should be about working together to build a better world.

Gash holds a Juris Doctor degree from Georgetown University Law Center, where she served as associate editor of the American Criminal Law Review. As an undergraduate at Clark University, she majored in psychology.

Gash lives in Highland Park and is married to Gregg Garmisa. They have two adult children – Sarah, who uses her MBA and Master of Public Policy degrees to work toward social justice with not-for-profit organizations, and Ben, who serves as the communications director for U.S. Senator Tammy Duckworth in Washington, D.C.

Notes

1960 births
Living people
People from Berkeley Heights, New Jersey
People from Highland Park, Illinois
Politicians from Summit, New Jersey
Clark University alumni
Georgetown University Law Center alumni
Illinois lawyers
Women state legislators in Illinois
Democratic Party members of the Illinois House of Representatives
2020 United States presidential electors
21st-century American women politicians